Dragomlja Vas is a small settlement south of Bereča Vas in the Municipality of Metlika in the White Carniola area of southeastern Slovenia. The entire area is part of the traditional region of Lower Carniola and is now included in the Southeast Slovenia Statistical Region.

References

External links
Dragomlja Vas on Geopedia

Populated places in the Municipality of Metlika